The University of Flensburg (Europa-Universität Flensburg) is a university in the city of Flensburg, Germany. It was founded in 1994 and is the northernmost university in Germany. Although having full university status and the right to award PhDs, Europa-Universität Flensburg mainly offers courses in education and other fields of the social sciences.

The university holds German-Danish study courses in cooperation with the University of Southern Denmark at Sønderborg, which involve an association with the Fachhochschule Flensburg.

Academics
The university has 200 permanent employees and more than 400 visiting professors and lecturers.

In the winter semester 2006/2007, the university received around 4,200 applications for places, but in the winter semester of the previous academic year the number was only 2,566. At the top of the applications in the winter semester 2006/2007 was the B.A. course in Teaching Science, 1977 applicants, followed by the B.A. course in International Management with 547 candidates. The B.A. course in Science of the Communication and Teaching is discontinued.  The B.A. course in Teaching Science and B.A. course in International Management have since been the only undergraduate programmes that the university offers.

Flensburg Campus

Europa-Universität Flensburg shares a campus and some facilities with the Flensburg University of Applied Sciences (Hochschule Flensburg). The infrastructure includes the Auditorium Maximum (called Audimax) lecture hall, the central library, a broad park area, student residences, a kindergarten, a sports and fitness center, the cafeteria (Mensa), several small cafeterias and a student pub, a water sports center and a campus chapel. The main railway station is about one mile from the campus, the beach about 5 miles away.

Faculties
There are five faculties, numbered Department I to Department V, each of these is divided into a number of institutes.

See also

 Flensburg catamaran

References

External links

  

 
Buildings and structures in Flensburg
Flensburg
Educational institutions established in 1994
1994 establishments in Germany